Anne van Dam (born 2 October 1995) is a Dutch professional golfer who plays on the LPGA Tour and Ladies European Tour.

Career
Van Dam turned professional in 2015. She began playing on the LET Access Series (LETAS) and Ladies European Tour (LET) in 2015 and won the HLR Golf Academy Open on the LETAS. In 2016, she again played on both tours and won the CitizenGuard LETAS Trophy on the LETAS and the Xiamen International Ladies Open on the LET. In 2017, she played mainly on the Ladies European Tour and finished fifth on the Order of Merit.

In 2018, van Dam played on both the Ladies European Tour and the Symetra Tour. She won twice on the LET, at the Estrella Damm Ladies Open and Andalucia Costa Del Sol Open De España Femenino and finished second Order of Merit. On the Symetra Tour, her best finish was T-8 at the FireKeepers Casino Hotel Championship. She competed in the LPGA Q-Series and earned an LPGA Tour card for 2019.

In 2019, van Dam played on both the LPGA Tour and the LET. She won the ActewAGL Canberra Classic on the LET. She earned a spot on the European Solheim Cup team via her LET Solheim Cup points ranking.

Van Dam is known for her driving distance. She led the category on the LET in 2017 and 2018 and is leading on both the LET and LPGA Tour as of August 2019.

Professional wins (7)

Ladies European Tour wins (5)
2016 Xiamen International Ladies Open^
2018 Estrella Damm Ladies Open, Andalucia Costa Del Sol Open De España Femenino
2019 ActewAGL Canberra Classic†, Andalucia Costa Del Sol Open De España Femenino (2)

^Co-sanctioned with the China LPGA Tour
†Co-sanctioned with the ALPG Tour

LET Access Series wins
2015 HLR Golf Academy Open
2016 CitizenGuard LETAS Trophy

Results in LPGA majors
Results not in chronological order before 2019.

CUT = missed the half-way cut
NT = no tournament
T = tied

Summary

Most consecutive cuts made – 6 (2019 Women's PGA – 2020 Women's PGA)
Longest streak of top-10s – 0

Team appearances
Amateur
European Girls' Team Championship (representing the Netherlands): 2012
Espirito Santo Trophy (representing the Netherlands): 2012, 2014
European Ladies' Team Championship: (representing Netherlands): 2014
Junior Solheim Cup (representing Europe): 2013

Professional
Solheim Cup (representing Europe): 2019 (winners)

Solheim Cup record

References

External links

Dutch female golfers
Ladies European Tour golfers
LPGA Tour golfers
Olympic golfers of the Netherlands
Golfers at the 2020 Summer Olympics
Sportspeople from Arnhem
1995 births
Living people